Lagden is a surname which may refer to:

Sir Godfrey Yeatman Lagden (1851–1934), British colonial administrator
Godfrey William Lagden (1906–1989), British member of parliament
Reginald Lagden (1893–1944), British businessman and sporting administrator
Ronald Lagden (1889–1915), English sportsman